Hacksaw Ridge is a 2016 biographical war film, directed by Mel Gibson and written by Andrew Knight and Robert Schenkkan. Starring Andrew Garfield, the film focuses on the World War II experiences of Desmond Doss, an American pacificist combat medic who was a Seventh-day Adventist Christian, refusing to carry or use a firearm or weapons of any kind. He became the first conscientious objector to be awarded the Medal of Honor, for service above and beyond the call of duty. It was released in the United States on November 4, 2016. The film was released to positive reviews, with a Rotten Tomatoes approval rating of 87%, based on 223 reviews, and an average rating of 7.2/10. Metacritic lists a score of 71 out of 100, based on 47 reviews.

Hacksaw Ridge won Best Film Editing and Best Sound Mixing and was nominated for Best Picture, Best Director, Best Actor for Garfield and Best Sound Editing at the Academy Awards. The film won Best Editing and was nominated for Best Actor in a Leading Role for Garfield, Best Adapted Screenplay, Best Sound and Best Makeup and Hair at the British Academy Film Awards. The film won Best Action Movie and Best Actor in an Action Movie for Garfield and was nominated for Best Picture, Best Director, Best Actor for Garfield, Best Editing and Best Hair and Makeup at the Critics' Choice Awards. The film received three nominations at the Golden Globe Awards, including Best Motion Picture – Drama, Best Actor – Motion Picture Drama for Garfield and Best Director. The film won Best Actor for Garfield, Best Film Editing and Best Sound and was nominated for Best Film, Best Director, Best Adapted Screenplay, Best Cinematography, Best Original Score and Best Art Direction and Production Design at the Satellite Awards.

Accolades

Notes

References

External links 
 

Lists of accolades by film